George Farquhar (born 14 December 1929) is a British wrestler. He competed in the men's freestyle middleweight at the 1956 Summer Olympics.

References

1929 births
Living people
British male sport wrestlers
Olympic wrestlers of Great Britain
Wrestlers at the 1956 Summer Olympics
Place of birth missing (living people)
Commonwealth Games medallists in wrestling
Wrestlers at the 1958 British Empire and Commonwealth Games
Commonwealth Games silver medallists for Scotland
Medallists at the 1958 British Empire and Commonwealth Games